Hidden Treasures Miss Nepal 2009, 13th Miss Nepal contest took place on September 25, 2009, at the Tribhuvan Army Club in Kathmandu. There were 16 young women, aged 18 years and above, shortlisted for the final.  Miss Nepal 1994, Ruby Rana, crowned the new Fem Miss Nepal 2009 on 25 September 2009.  The winner, Zenisha Moktan, represented Nepal at Miss World 2009, and the 1st Runner Up Richa Thapa Magar represented Nepal at Miss Earth 2009.

Results

Color keys

Sub-Titles

Contestants

Notes
 Contestant #1, Reetu Shakya was second runner-up at the World Miss University Nepal 2009.
 Contestant #11, Aayusha Karki was Miss Teen Nepal 2007 and World Miss University Nepal 2007.
 Contestant #12, Richa Thapa Magar Miss Culture, Miss Personality in Miss Teen Nepal 2003, Most Outstanding Student in VOW Top 10 College Women competition in 2007 & competed at Miss Tourism Queen Int'l 2009.
 Contestant #14, Kunchhang Moktan Tamang was Miss Tourism Queen Nepal 2007 & Top 20 Miss Teen Nepal 2006.
 Contestant #15, Akriti Shrestha was Top 10 Miss University Nepal 2007

References

External links
 Miss Nepal Official Website
 Miss Nepal 2009 Contestants

Beauty pageants in Nepal
2009 in Nepal
Miss Nepal